Hato Grande Airport  is an airport serving the hamlet of Hato Grande in the Chontales Department of Nicaragua.

There is rising terrain north through northwest of the runway.

See also

 Transport in Nicaragua
 List of airports in Nicaragua

References

External links
 OpenStreetMap - Hato Grande
 HERE/Nokia - Hato Grande
 Hato Grande

Airports in Nicaragua
Chontales Department